The Poppleton Block is located at 1001 Farnam Street in Downtown Omaha, Nebraska. The building was built in 1880 for Omaha lawyer and politician A.J. Poppleton, and was designated an Omaha Landmark on July 13, 1982, and was listed on the National Register of Historic Places later that year.

About
Designed by architect Henry Voss in the High Victorian Italianate style, the City of Omaha Landmarks Heritage Preservation Commission says it, "exemplifies the type of commercial building constructed in Omaha before the turn-of-the-century."

Poppleton used part of the three-story building to house his law firm but never actually worked there himself. The rest was leased out as office and commercial space. Over the years it continued to be used primarily for commercial purposes, and today it is still utilized as office space. The building includes heavily bracketed cornices and window openings that featuring a combination of round, segmental and stilted segmental arches. There are cast iron storefronts on the building, as well.

See also
 History of Omaha

References

External links

 Modern photo

Omaha Landmarks
National Register of Historic Places in Omaha, Nebraska
Commercial buildings completed in 1880
Office buildings in Omaha, Nebraska
Commercial buildings on the National Register of Historic Places in Nebraska
1880 establishments in Nebraska
Italianate architecture in Nebraska